Weihrauch & Weihrauch GmbH & Co. KG is a German manufacturer of target and sporting air rifles, air pistols, cartridge rifles and pistols. In North America, they are often distributed under the Beeman brand name.

History

1899–1970
The Hermann Weihrauch company was founded in 1899 in Zella-Mehlis, the same small German town where several other famous gun manufacturers such as Walther and Anschütz also began. Hermann Weihrauch, Sr. was well known for making excellent hunting rifles. His three sons, Otto, Werner, and Hermann, Jr., soon joined the family-based company. Several new models were introduced after World War I, including the HWZ 21 smallbore rifle (HWZ stands for Hermann Weihrauch, Zella-Mehlis). This was the first mass-produced German .22 rimfire rifle and soon developed an excellent match record. Double and triple barrel shotguns, over and under shotguns, and large bore hunting rifles rounded out the line and established an excellent reputation for quality.

In 1928, Weihrauch began international sale of bicycle parts and mechanical door closers. During World War II, Weihrauch was the only German factory to continue production of spare parts for bicycles. At the end of the war, Zella-Mehlis became part of the Soviet occupation zone and In 1948, the Weihrauchs were forced out of their homes and factories by the communist government. Otto Weihrauch became a mechanic and later a gunsmith in Zella-Mehlis. Werner went to work at the Jagdwaffenwerk (Hunting Weapon Factory) in nearby Suhl. Hermann Weihrauch, Jr. moved to the little German village of Mellrichstadt in Bavaria. There, with the help of his long-time hunting club friends and former customers, and his son Hans, he started the Weihrauch business all over again in the barracks of a pre-war laundry. Spare parts for bicycles were their first and main products.

When German companies were again allowed to manufacture airguns in the early 1950s, Weihrauch made their first air rifle, the HW Model 50V. This airgun had to have a smooth bore because the Allied Occupation Government would not allow rifled barrels. Finally, after the German Shooting Federation ("Deutscher Schützenbund") was re-established, the allied government allowed the production of rifled barrels. However, because they were not allowed to produce firearms, they put their efforts into making the finest sporting airguns in the world. Even after the firearm manufacturing ban finally was withdrawn, the Hermann Weihrauch KG company continued to produce sporting air rifles of the highest quality. The little HW 25 was slanted towards the youth market while versions of the HW 30 and HW 50 continued as solid mid-market air rifles. The HW 55 was one of Europe's leading barrel-cocking target rifles. The rather uncommon HW 55T version with its ornate Tyrolean-style stock, usually sporting fine walnut of exceptional grain, has always been a favorite among offhand shooters and collectors.

In 1955 they introduced a full size sporting air rifle in the guise of the HW35 which was to become their most successful model and was the first to feature the famous Rekord two stage sporting trigger developed from the target trigger of the HW55T, a trigger design that remains across the range unchanged to this day, the HW35 furthermore boasted a locking barrel catch and an automatic safety located at the rear of the cylinder, the HW35 was such a successful model that despite its relatively modest power output it still remains in the company's range, almost unchanged to this day.

An early attempt at magnum power

The EL54 was an early attempt (1954) at achieving magnum power in a spring-piston air rifle. It is an HW 35 with an ether injector attached on the right side of the compression chamber tube. A medical ether ampule was inserted into the device and crushed. Each time the rifle was cocked and loaded, a shot of ether was injected into the compression chamber, where the heat of compression ignited it, raising gas pressure in the compression chamber.

After Hermann Weihrauch, Jr. died in 1967, a new era in the company began under the leadership of Hans Weihrauch, Sr. (born in 1926 and the father of today's directors Stefan and Hans-Hermann.) The company celebrated 1970 with the introduction of the HW 70 air pistol. The company had begun plans, and first production, of a repeating air pistol before World War II, but the war aborted its regular production. Although pre-war HWZ sales literature shows an illustration of that thirty-shot top-lever spring piston air pistol, only one specimen of that HWZ LP-1 air pistol is now known. It had survived both the war and the Russian occupation by having safely gone overseas as a sales sample to the Hy-Score Arms Company in the USA. The Hy-Score president, Steve Laszlo, had given it to his friend, Robert Beeman. He surprised Hans  Sr. and Christel Weihrauch (the husband/wife directors of the new HW company) when they were visiting the Beeman home in San Anselmo, California, by showing them this Weihrauch airgun which was completely unknown to them.

1970-1990
The close connection between the owners of the Weihrauch company and Beeman Precision Airguns led to one of the first (if not the first) joint ventures between a German-based manufacturer and an American airgun distributor. After a period of importing Weihrauch-designed airguns, the Beemans had decided that they needed to introduce a German-made air rifle with American styling and features. They had determined that their main need, in addition to new styling, was a power level above anything that had been known before in the airgun field. They had been very impressed with the quality of the long running HW 35, but puzzled by its power, which was lower than that of the Feinwerkbau Model 124. That gun, for which Beeman had developed a large market in the U.S., had a lighter spring and smaller compression chamber.

Based on their computer simulation studies, the Beemans proposed a new air rifle model with the quality of the HW 35. This cooperative development program resulted in the Beeman R1 (sold outside of the US as the Weihrauch HW 80 in a lower-power version with a more European-style stock). The new model quickly became the best-selling adult sporting air rifle; it is credited with bringing the American airgun market into the world of adult airguns. Due to delivery problems with the longer, more complex R1 stock, the first HW 80 rifles were available some weeks earlier than the R1. This led to the incorrect conclusion made by some that the R1 was a copy of the HW80. Tom Gaylord also has written about that coincidence in his book The Beeman R1 and pointed out Beeman was the main force behind the invention of the R1/HW80 and that Weihrauch did an outstanding job of production engineering and manufacture.

Almost the same thing happened with the introduction of the next Weihrauch air pistol, the very successful Beeman P1 (sold outside of the US as the Weihrauch HW 45). Although the Beemans provided the full specifications and design features of this pistol, there was an initial misunderstanding about the external appearance. The factory presented a rather bulky, high top, "Desert Eagle-like" design which the Beemans did not think would appeal to the American market. They felt that it should follow the very popular and trim lines of the Colt 1911 automatic pistol. So the Beeman Company quickly made a plaster-of-Paris, life-sized 3D model which the Weihrauch technicians used as a model for the final design. The Weihrauch engineers were far ahead of their time in a different way because of another misunderstanding: they thought that, because the Beeman plans were blank in the powerplant area, that Beeman had suggested a single-stroke pneumatic air system instead of the desired, more powerful spring-piston action. These pneumatic models came some years later, when the Beeman P2/Weihrauch HW 75 was introduced. The huge commercial success of the P1 design was aided by its many features: high power, accuracy, solid metal construction, three caliber choices, different choices of finish, and especially its great flexibility: the ability to fire at two power levels, integral scope rail, and the availability of a Beeman-designed shoulder stock. The R1/HW80, and its several variations, gave rise to a lighter, easier to cock model: the R10/HW85.

Weihrauch then produced an under-lever spring piston rifle, the HW77. This gun opened fully for loading directly into the breech of the barrel, like a Feinwerkbau match rifle. This was a great improvement over under lever air rifles which utilized a loading tap from which the pellet had to leap into the barrel. The HW77 and HW77 Carbine, with their rigid barrel and easy cocking and loading, became extremely popular in countries with lower power limits.

The field-style air rifle designs for the American market were a great success because only a very small minority of adult airgun shooters were involved in any competition or group shooting activities. Field target shooting was the most popular of the American group airgun shooting sports, but even that involved much less than one percent of adult airgun shooters. Almost the exact opposite was true of airgun shooters in Germany; there, most such shooters were involved in 10 meter competition. Nevertheless, in 1989, the leading German gun magazine, VISIER, discovered from a survey that a large number of German airgun shooters would be willing to pay more than 500 DM (about 300 U.S. dollars) for an air rifle which was equipped with a sporting-style stock and designed for scope use. Many Germans responding to the poll also submitted useful suggestions for new designs to be added to the many new stock designs being developed by Weihrauch.

The German reunification in 1990 resulted in many changes for every German citizen and manufacturer. Weihrauch began a cooperation with Theoben Engineering in England which resulted in the introduction of the first German/English air rifle design: the Weihrauch HW 90 (the Beeman versions are the RX, RX-1 and RX-2). This was the first Weihrauch rifle using the patented Theoben gas-spring system. These new rifles sold very well in Great Britain and the United States for small-game hunting.

The great optimism of that period of the company's development was dampened by the unexpected death of Hans Weihrauch, Sr. on 3 April 1990 aged 63. His business accomplishments were so admired that he was posthumously decorated with the Federal Cross of Merit. His wife, Christel, and sons, Stefan and Hans-Hermann, took the reins of the company. Christel Weihrauch had shared the management of the firm for decades and the preparation of the two sons for their expected future management roles was well advanced. Both had been involved with the company all of their lives and had nearly finished their engineering and marketing training as well.

The fall of the German wall close to Mellrichstadt meant they were "in the middle of Germany." This opened new markets for their surface engineering branch. They added new machines for electroless nickel plating and bronzing (and made the floors slip-proof with expanded mesh, stainless-steel fencing panels supplied from the nearby fallen Iron Curtain).

Cartridge rifles

 HW 660 Match
 HW 60 Match
 HW 60 J
 HW 66

Cartridge pistols

 HW 4
 HW 4 T
 HW 357

Revolvers

 Arminius is Weihrauch's line of revolvers

Air rifles

Evolution of the high-power break-barrel sporter range 
The HW 35 was Weihrauch's first mass-market, high-powered, spring-powered sporter air rifle. However, with time, the HW 35 became technically obsolete as newer, more advanced air rifles entered the market.
The HW 80, HW 85 and HW 95 were all designed as evolutionary replacements for the HW 35, and all occupy the same approximate market segment. However, Weihrauch did not follow the conventional and expected practice of retiring its older sporter rifles to make way for newer models. Instead, the HW 80, HW 85 and HW 95 were simply added to the product lineup as they were introduced. This sometimes results in confusion among buyers, many of whom are not familiar with the history of Weihrauch products.

Air rifle model designation suffixes 
The meanings of the suffixes used by Weihrauch for air rifles are as follows:
 'E' (Export) rifles typically have American-specification walnut stocks with white buttplate and grip-cap accents, and factory-fitted sling swivels.
 The barrels of 'FSB' (Fully-shrouded barrel) rifles have an outer shroud (sleeve), internal baffles, and larger overall diameter. This is intended as a more compact, albeit less effective alternative to a screw-on or slip-on silencer, which would add extra length to the rifle.
 'K' (‘Kurz’, German for ‘short’) rifles have a carbine-style barrel that is shorter than the barrel fitted to the equivalent full-length rifle.
 When applied to the HW 97, 'L' signifies 'Lang' (German for 'Long'), denoting a 385mm barrel. On all other rifles, 'L' signifies a 'Luxus' (German for ‘luxury’) rifle with a stock finished to a very high standard, usually from Walnut.
 The ‘LS’ (‘Lockschaft’, German for ‘thumbhole’) suffix was only used on HW 35 models equipped with a thumbhole stock. On all other Weihrauch thumbhole-stock rifles, this suffix was replaced with ‘T’.
 The 'M' (Match) suffix was only used on HW 55 models equipped with a match-style stock.
 Where basic HW 30 M/II and HW 50 M/II rifles are equipped with the unadjustable ‘Perfekt’ trigger, an 'S' suffix signifies an upgraded model fitted with the fully adjustable 'Rekord' trigger. When applied to the HW 55, ‘S’ means 'Sport', signifying a plain Beech sporter stock.
 'ST' signifies a synthetic (plastic) stock.
 'STL' signifies a barrel, receiver and cocking lever in a light silvered finish of electroless satin nickel plating instead of conventional blueing. Note that this suffix does not, as is commonly assumed, mean ‘Stainless Steel’.
 When applied to the HW 55, 'T' means 'Tyrolean', signifying a Tyrolean-style curved cheekpiece stock. For all other Weihrauch rifles, 'T' signifies a thumbhole stock.

Air pistols

Weihrauch Patent information 
  Selbstladepistole mit Spannabzug. Veröffentlicht am 4. Mai 1943, Anmelder: Hermann Weihrauch Gewehr und Fahrradteilefabrik.‌
  Selbstladepistole mit Spannabzug. Veröffentlicht am 11. September 1943, Anmelder: Hermann Weihrauch Gewehr und Fahrradteilefabrik.‌
  Insbesondere als Pistole ausgebildete Druckluftschusswaffe. Veröffentlicht am 11. September 1943, Anmelder: Firma Hermann Weihrauch.‌
  Trommel-Revolver. Veröffentlicht am 12. Dezember 1974, Anmelder: Hermann Weihrauch OHG Sportwaffen und Fahrradteilefabrik, 8744 Mellrichstadt, DE.‌
  Pistole. Veröffentlicht am 7. Dezember 1989, Anmelder: Hermann Weihrauch KG, 8744 Mellrichstadt, DE, Erfinder: Helmut Sauer, 8745 Ostheim, DE.‌
  Tuerschliesser mit Feststellvorrichtung. Angemeldet am 5. Februar 1937, veröffentlicht am 11. April 1939, Anmelder: Firma Hermann Weihrauch, Erfinder: Werner Weihrauch, Hans Müller.‌
  Hydraulischer Tuerschliesser. Veröffentlicht am 2. August 1940, Anmelder: Hermann Weihrauch, Waffenfabrik, Erfinder: Hermann Weihrauch, Werner Weihrauch.‌

References

Further reading 
 Josef Albl: Scheibenwaffen, Hinterladersysteme von 1850 bis 1950, 2014.
 Frank Baranowski: Rüstungsproduktion in der Mitte Deutschlands 1929 – 1945: Südniedersachsen mit Braunschweiger Land sowie Nordthüringen einschließlich des Südharzes – vergleichende Betrachtung des zeitlich versetzten Aufbaus zweier Rüstungszentren, Rockstuhl, 2015, .
 Robert Beeman, John B. Allen: Blue Book of Airguns, Blue Book Publications, 2010, .
 Ernst G. Dieter: Im Zeichen des Waffenschmieds, Teil 2, Erfindungen, Patente, Konstruktionen, Kuriositäten : Beiträge aus Suhl, Mehlis, Zella St. Blasii, Zella-Mehlis zur waffentechnischen Entwicklung.
 Robert Simpson: Training Rifles of Third Reich Germany, Brad Simpson Publishing, 2017, .
 Walter Harold Black Smith, Joseph Smith: The Book of Rifles, 4. edition, Castle Books, 1972
 John Walter: Dictionary of Guns & Gunmakers, issue 05/2018
 Robert E. Walker: Cartridges and Firearm Identification, CRC Press, 2013, .
 J. B. Wood: Firearms Assembly Disassembly, Part 2 Revolvers, DBI Books Inc., .

External links

 Weihrauch's official site

Firearm manufacturers of Germany
Weapons manufacturing companies